"Ashes to Ashes" is the seventh track on Faith No More's sixth studio album Album of the Year. It was the album's first single and was released on May 19, 1997. It was reissued on January 8, 1998.

Background
When asked about the song, Billy Gould replied:

Reception
In his June 1997 review for Album of the Year, Joshua Sindell of Phoenix New Times characterized the song as being a "Soundgarden stomp flirting with a New Romantic-like, arms-outstretched melody."

The Guardian ranked it as the tenth best Faith No More song in 2014. They wrote, "Album of the Year sounded unfinished and is barely listenable. But one track, 'Ashes to Ashes', stood out. It is a moody rocker, with a memorably anthemic chorus that soared thanks to one of the finest vocal performances of Patton's career." When Consequence of Sound ranked all 126 Faith No More songs in 2015, they placed "Ashes to Ashes" at number ten. However, a July 1997 live version of the track from the "Stripsearch" single appeared towards the bottom of the list. Louder Sound listed it as the eighth best Faith No More song in 2018. The order of their list was chosen by English funk metal band The Final Clause of Tacitus.

Australian radio station Triple J ranked it 31st on their annual "Hottest 100" list for the year of 1997.

Covers
In 2021, the electronic duo Last Survivor released a synthwave cover of the song. The following year, American progressive rock band Anova Skyway released a cover of the song on their EP Reset.

Track lists
Original
"Gold on Maroon" cover
"Ashes to Ashes"
"The Big Kahuna"
"Mouth to Mouth"
"Ashes to Ashes (Hardknox Alternative Mix)"

"Maroon on Gold" cover
"Ashes to Ashes (Radio Edit)"
"Light Up and Let Go"
"Collision"
"Ashes To Ashes (Automatic 5 Dub[A])"

Reissue
"Gold on Black" cover
"Ashes to Ashes (Edit)"
"Ashes to Ashes (Dillinja Remix)"
"The Gentle Art of Making Enemies"
"Ashes to Ashes" (Live[B])

"Black on Gold" cover
"Ashes to Ashes"
"Last Cup of Sorrow (Rammstein Mix)"
"Last Cup of Sorrow (Sharam VS FNM Club Mix)"
"The Gentle Art of Making Enemies" (Live)

Charts

Certifications

Footnotes

<li>^ While only one of DJ Icey & Maestro's "Ashes to Ashes" remixes appear on the UK single set, two remixes were recorded and released: 
The version on the UK "Maroon on Gold" single (850 905-2) as well as Album of the Year bonus disc. This remix is titled "Ashes To Ashes (Automatic 5 Dub)" and DJ Icey and Maestro are given credits in the liner notes.
A completely different remix which appears on the European and Australian pressing  (London Records - 850 911-2) and on the promotional UK (London Records - Ashes-1 ) and French (Barclay 3594 ) pressings. This remix is titled "Ashes To Ashes (Icey and Mystro Mix)".
<li>^ Live at the Phoenix Festival '97 on July 27, 1997.

References

Faith No More songs
1997 singles
Songs written by Billy Gould
Songs written by Roddy Bottum
Songs written by Mike Patton
Songs written by Mike Bordin
1997 songs
American alternative rock songs